German submarine U-264 was a Type VIIC U-boat of Nazi Germany's Kriegsmarine during World War II. The submarine was laid down on 21 June 1941 at the Bremer-Vulkan-Vegesacker Werft (yard) in Bremen as yard number 29. She was launched on 2 April 1942 and commissioned on 22 May under the command of Oberleutnant zur See Hartwig Looks.

She was sunk on 19 February 1944 by British warships but the entire crew survived and were taken prisoner.

Design
German Type VIIC submarines were preceded by the shorter Type VIIB submarines. U-264 had a displacement of  when at the surface and  while submerged. She had two shafts and two  propellers.

U-264 was fitted with five  torpedo tubes (four fitted at the bow and one at the stern), fourteen torpedoes, one  SK C/35 naval gun, 220 rounds, and two twin  C/30 anti-aircraft guns. The boat had a complement of between forty-four and sixty.

Service history
After training with the 8th U-boat Flotilla, the boat became operational on 1 November 1942 when she was transferred to the 6th flotilla.

First and second patrols
U-264s first patrol began when she departed Kiel on 3 November 1942. She entered the Atlantic Ocean after negotiating the gap between the Faroe and the Shetland Islands. On 17 November, she sank the Mount Taurus. She was attacked by a Norwegian corvette, HNoMS Potentilla, on the 20th. No damage was sustained. She entered St. Nazaire in occupied France, on 4 December.

The boat's second sortie was relatively uneventful.

Third patrol
On 26 February 1943 just off Cape Finisterre she fired a salvo of four torpedoes at  but all four missed; Sussex had just attacked and sunk the German Tanker Hohenfriedburg.
On 17 April 1943, she was in the process of attacking Convoy HX 233 when she was attacked by the escorts. The boat was badly damaged, but was repaired by the crew and the patrol continued. She docked at Lorient, on the French Atlantic coast, on 1 June.

There then followed a pair of short 'hops' between Lorient and St. Nazaire in August and September 1943.

Fourth patrol
While on her fourth patrol, U-264 and two other U-boats were re-fuelling from the supply submarine  on 4 October 1943 when they were surprised by aircraft from the American carrier . The more nimble Type VIIs escaped, but the 'milch cow' was sunk by the Avengers. U-264 did not remain unscathed for long; later that day she was attacked, the damage inflicted forced a return to base.

Fifth patrol and loss
For her final sortie, she was again in the North Atlantic. Starling opened fire on the submarine, scoring several hits, as the crew abandoned the boat and it then sank.

The entire crew of 52 officers and men were taken prisoner.

Wolfpacks
U-264 took part in eleven wolfpacks, namely:
 Kreuzotter (15 – 20 November 1942) 
 Delphin (23 January – 9 February 1943) 
 Rochen (9 – 20 February 1943) 
 Without name (15 – 18 April 1943) 
 Specht (19 April – 4 May 1943) 
 Fink (4 – 6 May 1943) 
 Naab (12 – 15 May 1943) 
 Donau 2 (15 – 19 May 1943) 
 Mosel (19 – 23 May 1943) 
 Igel 2 (15 – 17 February 1944) 
 Hai 1 (17 – 19 February 1944)

Summary of raiding history

TV appearance
The captain of U-264, Captain Hartwig Looks, appears in the 1977 BBC televisions series The Secret War episode 7; "The Battle of the Atlantic".

References

Bibliography

External links

World War II submarines of Germany
German Type VIIC submarines
U-boats commissioned in 1942
1942 ships
U-boats sunk by depth charges
U-boats sunk by British warships
U-boats sunk in 1944
World War II shipwrecks in the Atlantic Ocean
Ships built in Bremen (state)
Maritime incidents in February 1944